The men's 3000 metres steeplechase event at the 1994 Commonwealth Games was held on 23 August in Victoria, British Columbia

Results

References

3000
1994